The 2011 Election Committee subsector elections took place between 7:30 am and 10:30 pm on 11 December 2011. The Election Committee sub-sector elections are a part of the contemporary political process of Hong Kong. The election's purpose is to decide the 1,044 members of the Election Committee of Hong Kong. The resulting Election Committee is then responsible for electing the Chief Executive of Hong Kong Special Administrative Region (SAR) in the 2012 Election.

Background
The breakthrough of the electoral reform in 2010 changed the membership of the Election Committee for the first time which expanded the size of the Election Committee from 800 members to 1,200 members. Each sector were allocated 100 more seats proportionally and the 10 Special Members were elected to fill the vacancy of the 10 new ex officio members Legislative Council which was also expanded from 60 to 70 seats in the electoral reform but was to be elected in the following September election. The Special Members were 4 in the Chinese People's Political Consultative Conference sub-sector and 2 in the Heung Yee Kuk, the Hong Kong and Kowloon District Councils, and the New Territories District Councils respectively.

Composition
The Election Committee consisted of 1,044 [1,034] members elected from 35 subsectors, 60 members nominated by the Religious sub-sector and 96 [106] ex officio members. (Hong Kong deputies from the National People's Congress and Legislative Council of Hong Kong members). As the term of office commenced on 1 February 2012, the 1,200 member Election Committee was formed by 38 Election Committee Sub-sectors:

 Heung Yee Kuk (28) [26]
 Agriculture and Fisheries (60)
 Insurance (18)
 Transport (18)
 Education (30)
 Legal (30)
 Accountancy (30)
 Medical (30)
 Health Services (30)
 Engineering (30)
 Architectural, Surveying and Planning (30)
 Labour (60)
 Social Welfare (60)
 Real Estate and Construction (18)
 Tourism (18)
 Commercial (First) (18)
 Commercial (Second) (18)
 Industrial (First) (18)
 Industrial (Second) (18)
 Finance (18)
 Financial Services (18)
 Sports, Performing Arts, Culture and Publication (60)
 Import and Export (18)
 Textiles and Garment (18)
 Wholesale and Retail (18)
 Information Technology (30)
 Higher Education (30)
Hotel (17)
Catering (17)
Chinese Medicine (30)
Chinese People's Political Consultative Conference (55) [51]
Employers' Federation of HK (16)
HK and Kowloon District Councils (59) [57]
New Territories District Councils (62)
HK Chinese Enterprises Association (16)
National People's Congress (36)
Legislative Council (60) [70]
Religious (60)

Note: Figures in brackets denotes the number of members and figures in square brackets denotes the number of members commencing in October 2012.

Number of members nominated by the six designated bodies of the religious sub-sector:
Catholic Diocese of Hong Kong (10 members)
Chinese Muslim Cultural and Fraternal Association (10 members)
Hong Kong Christian Council (10 members)
The Hong Kong Taoist Association (10 members)
The Confucian Academy (10 members)
The Hong Kong Buddhist Association (10 members)

Nominations
The nomination period for the elections was between 8 and 15 November 2011 (The Hong Kong and Kowloon District Councils, and the New Territories District Councils Sub-sectors had a nomination period between 18 and 24 November 2011).

Forums
Two candidate forums were arranged for all candidates and each forum was divided into two sessions. Candidates numbered 1–21 attended the first session on 23 October 2011, whilst candidates numbered 22–42 attended the second session on 20 and 23 October 2011.

Election results

Results by subsectors
Statistics are generated from the official election website:

Result by affiliations
The election results are generated from the official election website. The political affiliations are according to the candidate's self-proclaimed affiliations shown on the election platforms, as well as from the news.

|-
! style="background-color:#E9E9E9;text-align:center;" colspan=3 rowspan=2 |Affiliation
! style="background-color:#E9E9E9;text-align:center;" colspan=2 |1st Sector
! style="background-color:#E9E9E9;text-align:center;" colspan=2 |2nd Sector
! style="background-color:#E9E9E9;text-align:center;" colspan=2 |3rd Sector
! style="background-color:#E9E9E9;text-align:center;" colspan=2 |4th Sector
! style="background-color:#E9E9E9;text-align:center;" colspan=2 |Total
|-
! style="background-color:#E9E9E9;text-align:right;" |Standing
! style="background-color:#E9E9E9;text-align:right;" |Elected
! style="background-color:#E9E9E9;text-align:right;" |Standing
! style="background-color:#E9E9E9;text-align:right;" |Elected
! style="background-color:#E9E9E9;text-align:right;" |Standing
! style="background-color:#E9E9E9;text-align:right;" |Elected
! style="background-color:#E9E9E9;text-align:right;" |Standing
! style="background-color:#E9E9E9;text-align:right;" |Elected
! style="background-color:#E9E9E9;text-align:right;" |Standing
! style="background-color:#E9E9E9;text-align:right;" |Elected
|-
|style="background-color:Pink" rowspan="20" |
| width=1px style="background-color: " |
| style="text-align:left;" |Democratic Alliance for the Betterment and Progress of Hong Kong
|12
|10
|2
|2
|9
|5
|61
|61
|84
|78
|-
| width=1px style="background-color: " |
| style="text-align:left;" |Liberal Party
|14
|13
|2
|1
|colspan=2|–
|5
|5
|21
|19
|-
| width=1px style="background-color: " |
| style="text-align:left;" |A16 Alliance
|colspan=2|–
|16
|15
|colspan=2|–
|colspan=2|–
|16
|15
|-
| width=1px style="background-color: " |
| style="text-align:left;" |ICT Energy
|colspan=2|–
|24
|8
|colspan=2|–
|colspan=2|–
|24
|8
|-
|style="background-color: "|
| style="text-align:left;" | Federation of Hong Kong and Kowloon Labour Unions
|colspan=2|–
|colspan=2|–
|10
|8
|colspan=2|–
|10
|8
|-
|style="background-color: "|
| style="text-align:left;" | Hong Kong Federation of Trade Unions
|2
|1
|colspan=2|–
|2
|2
|3
|3
|7
|6
|-
| width=1px style="background-color: " |
| style="text-align:left;" |Civil Force
|colspan=2|–
|colspan=2|–
|colspan=2|–
|5
|5
|5
|5
|-
| width=1px style="background-color: " |
| style="text-align:left;" |New Territories Association of Societies
|colspan=2|–
|colspan=2|–
|colspan=2|–
|4
|4
|4
|4
|-
| width=1px style="background-color: " |
| style="text-align:left;" |Education Convergence
|colspan=2|–
|6
|3
|colspan=2|–
|colspan=2|–
|6
|3
|-
| width=1px style="background-color: " |
| style="text-align:left;" |New People's Party
|colspan=2|–
|1
|1
|colspan=2|–
|2
|2
|3
|3
|-
| width=1px style="background-color: " |
| style="text-align:left;" |Action 9
|colspan=2|–
|9
|2
|colspan=2|–
|colspan=2|–
|9
|2
|-
| width=1px style="background-color: " |
| style="text-align:left;" |Your Vote Counts
|colspan=2|–
|6
|2
|colspan=2|–
|colspan=2|–
|6
|2
|-
| width=1px style="background-color: " |
| style="text-align:left;" |Y5 Give Me Five
|colspan=2|–
|5
|2
|colspan=2|–
|colspan=2|–
|5
|2
|-
| width=1px style="background-color: " |
| style="text-align:left;" |Hong Kong Federation of Education Workers
|colspan=2|–
|3
|1
|colspan=2|–
|colspan=2|–
|3
|1
|-
| width=1px style="background-color: " |
| style="text-align:left;" |Government Disciplined Services General Union
|colspan=2|–
|colspan=2|–
|2
|1
|colspan=2|–
|2
|1
|-
| width=1px style="background-color: " |
| style="text-align:left;" |Hong Kong Women Teachers' Organization
|colspan=2|–
|2
|1
|colspan=2|–
|colspan=2|–
|2
|1
|-
| width=1px style="background-color: " |
| style="text-align:left;" |New Century Forum
|1
|1
|colspan=2|–
|colspan=2|–
|colspan=2|–
|1
|1
|-
| width=1px style="background-color: " |
| style="text-align:left;" |Welfare Empower Hong Kong
|colspan=2|–
|colspan=2|–
|23
|0
|colspan=2|–
|23
|0
|-
| width=1px style="background-color: " |
| style="text-align:left;" |Vox Pop
|colspan=2|–
|12
|0
|colspan=2|–
|colspan=2|–
|12
|0
|-
| width=1px style="background-color: " |
| style="text-align:left;" |Estimated pro-Beijing individuals and others
|317
|275
|386
|131
|245
|165
|130
|124
|1,078
|695
|- style="background-color:Pink"
| colspan=3 style="text-align:left;" | Total for pro-Beijing camp || 346	|| 300 || 484 || 177 || 281 || 173 || 210 || 204 || 1,321 || 854
|-
|style="background-color:LightGreen" rowspan="15" |
| width=1px style="background-color: " |
| style="text-align:left;" |Demo-Social 60
|colspan=2|–
|colspan=2|–
|31
|29
|colspan=2|–
|31
|29
|-
| width=1px style="background-color: " |
| style="text-align:left;" |Hong Kong Social Workers' General Union
|colspan=2|–
|colspan=2|–
|29
|28
|colspan=2|–
|29
|28
|-
| width=1px style="background-color: " |
| style="text-align:left;" |ProDem22
|colspan=2|–
|22
|22
|colspan=2|–
|colspan=2|–
|22
|22
|-
| width=1px style="background-color: " |
| style="text-align:left;" |IT Voice 2012
|colspan=2|–
|19
|19
|colspan=2|–
|colspan=2|–
|19
|19
|-
| width=1px style="background-color: " |
| style="text-align:left;" |Hong Kong Professional Teachers' Union
|colspan=2|–
|17
|17
|colspan=2|–
|colspan=2|–
|17
|17
|-
| width=1px style="background-color: " |
| style="text-align:left;" |Democratic Party
|colspan=2|–
|18
|14
|colspan=2|–
|5
|0
|23
|14
|-
| width=1px style="background-color: " |
| style="text-align:left;" |Civic Party
|colspan=2|–
|14
|13
|colspan=2|–
|1
|0
|15
|13
|-
| width=1px style="background-color: " |
| style="text-align:left;" |Academics In Support of Democracy
|colspan=2|–
|13
|13
|colspan=2|–
|colspan=2|–
|13
|13
|-
| width=1px style="background-color: " |
| style="text-align:left;" |Democratic Accountants
|colspan=2|–
|9
|9
|colspan=2|–
|colspan=2|–
|9
|9
|-
| width=1px style="background-color: " |
| style="text-align:left;" |Progressive Social Work
|colspan=2|–
|colspan=2|–
|8
|2
|colspan=2|–
|8
|2
|-
| width=1px style="background-color: " |
| style="text-align:left;" |Hong Kong Association for Democracy and People's Livelihood
|colspan=2|–
|2
|2
|colspan=2|–
|colspan=2|–
|2
|2
|-
| width=1px style="background-color: " |
| style="text-align:left;" |Neo Democrats
|colspan=2|–
|2
|2
|colspan=2|–
|colspan=2|–
|2
|2
|-
| width=1px style="background-color: " |
| style="text-align:left;" |Engineers for Universal Suffrage
|colspan=2|–
|6
|1
|colspan=2|–
|colspan=2|–
|6
|1
|-
| width=1px style="background-color: " |
| style="text-align:left;" |Hong Kong Chinese Medicine Practitioners' Rights General Union
|colspan=2|–
|11
|0
|colspan=2|–
|colspan=2|–
|11
|0
|-
| width=1px style="background-color: " |
| style="text-align:left;" |Pro-democratic individuals and others
|3
|0
|2
|2
|colspan=2|–
|colspan=2|–
|5
|2
|- style="background-color:LightGreen"
| colspan=3 style="text-align:left;" | Total for pro-democracy camp || 3 || 0 || 135 || 114 || 68 || 59 || 6 || 0 || 212 || 173
|-
| width=1px style="background-color: " rowspan=4 |
| width=1px style="background-color: " |
| style="text-align:left;" |Hong Kong Medical Association
|colspan=2|–
|30
|15
|colspan=2|–
|colspan=2|–
|30
|15
|-
| width=1px style="background-color: " |
| style="text-align:left;" |Public Surgeons' United
|colspan=2|–
|8
|2
|colspan=2|–
|colspan=2|–
|8
|2
|-
| width=1px style="background-color: " |
| style="text-align:left;" |Hong Kong Public Doctors' Association
|colspan=2|–
|4
|0
|colspan=2|–
|colspan=2|–
|4
|0
|-
| width=1px style="background-color: " |
| style="text-align:left;" |Hong Kong and Kowloon Trades Union Council
|colspan=2|–
|colspan=2|–
|3
|0
|colspan=2|–
|3
|0
|-
|style="text-align:left;background-color:#E9E9E9" colspan="3"|Total (turnout 27.60%)
|style="text-align:right;background-color:#E9E9E9"|349
|style="text-align:right;background-color:#E9E9E9"|300
|style="text-align:right;background-color:#E9E9E9"|651
|style="text-align:right;background-color:#E9E9E9"|300	
|style="text-align:right;background-color:#E9E9E9"|362	
|style="text-align:right;background-color:#E9E9E9"|240	
|style="text-align:right;background-color:#E9E9E9"|216	
|style="text-align:right;background-color:#E9E9E9"|204	
|style="text-align:right;background-color:#E9E9E9"|1,578	
|style="text-align:right;background-color:#E9E9E9"|1,044	
|}

Overview of outcome
There were total of 11 subsectors being uncontested, most of them are in the First Sector where the business interests are rooted. Nevertheless, the election became much more competitive as supporters of both Henry Tang and Leung Chun-ying, the two potential candidates for the 2012 Chief Executive race, tried to gain as much seats. The pan-democracy camp secured the 150-member threshold to nominate a candidate to challenge to pro-Beijing dominated Chief Executive election in the following year.

Catering sub-sector 
The Catering sub-sector was contested by two candidate lists the Cater17, led by the Catering Legislative Councillor Tommy Cheung Yu-yan and considered Henry Tang's supporters, and 星火行動, led by Simon Wong Ka-wo and considered Leung Chun-ying's supporters. Total of 34 candidates from the two lists equally contested for 17 seats. The Cater17 list won all 17 seats. Notable elected candidates include Allan Zeman, chairman of the Ocean Park Hong Kong.

Accountancy sub-sector
Many groups contested in the Accountancy sub-sector. The A16 Alliance was formed by accountants from the Big Four firms, the group was considered as Henry Tang's camp. 15 of the 16 candidates were elected with Eric Li got the highest votes.

Two groups called "Your Vote Counts" and "Y5 Give Me Five" were supported by member of the Leung Chun-ying's election campaign office and Accountancy Legislative Councillor Paul Chan. "Your Vote Counts" got two of the six candidates elected and "Y5 Give Me Five" got two of the five.

The Action 9 group was formed with 9 candidates with the election platform of increasing supply of public housing, solving the disparity between the rich and poor and implementing universal suffrage. The group stated that they would not rule out to nominate a pan democrat candidate but also said they were open on the idea of nominating Leung Chun-ying. The group got two members elected.

9 candidates from the pan-democracy were all elected to the Accountancy sub-sector.

Chinese Medicine sub-sector
The Hong Kong Chinese Medicine Practitioners' Rights General Union challenged the pro-Beijing groups' dominance in the Chinese Medicine sub-sector but all 11 candidates failed to get elected.

Education sub-sector
The Education sub-sector has been the stronghold of pan-democracy camp. The pro-democratic Hong Kong Professional Teachers' Union put out a 25-candidate list for the 30 seats in the sub-sector in which five of them are also the Democratic Party members. All candidates were elected including Ip Kin-yuen, who won the Education functional constituency seat in the Legislative Council election in the following year.

The pro-Beijing Hong Kong Federation of Education Workers got only one seat. The Education Convergence had 6 candidates and 3 of them were also elected. One of the two candidates from the Hong Kong Women Teachers' Organization were also elected.

Engineering sub-sector
Sponsored by the Professional Commons, the pro-democratic group "Engineers for Universal Suffrage" (E4US) put out an 8-candidate list in which two of them are Civic Party members including Albert Lai. Only Albert Lai and one other pan democrat were elected. Other elected members included Lo Wai-kwok who won the Engineering functional constituency in the Legislative Council in September 2012, and Mak Chai-kwong who was appointed Secretary for Development in July 2012 by Leung Chun-ying.

Higher Education sub-sector
In succession to the 15 candidates group "Academics In Support of Democracy" in 2006 for the previous Election Committee sub-sector election, the group had 24 candidates running for 30 seats in this election. Many of them are with party membership such as Joseph Cheng Yu-shek, Kenneth Chan Ka-lok, and Kuan Hsin-chi are from the Civic Party, Helena Wong Pik-wan from the Democratic Party, and two from the Neo Democrats including Chan King-ming.

Information Technology sub-sector
IT Voice 2012 is an election coalition for the Information Technology sub-sector election formed by a group of pan democrats including Sin Chung-kai and Charles Mok. All 20 candidates were elected. The pro-Beijing ICT Energy including DAB member Elizabeth Quat got only 8 of the 24 members elected. The Other two elected candidates without affiliation included Ricky Wong.

Legal sub-sector
22 pro-democratic independent candidates led by former chairman of the Hong Kong Bar Association Edward Chan King-sang formed the "ProDem22" and 8 candidates from the Democratic Party, Civic Party, and the Association for Democracy and People's Livelihood formed the "PanDem8" while the vice-chairman of the Law Society of Hong Kong Ambrose Lam San-keung led another 12 candidates group "Vox Pop" which was considered pro-Beijing. The 30 pan democrat candidates were able to collect all seats while "Vox Pop" failed to get any seat.

Medical sub-sector
The Medical sub-sector was the most competitive subsector in the election with total 83 candidates running for 30 seats. The Hong Kong Medical Association filled in 30 candidates and half of them got elected. A list led by Ko Wing-man got 2 of the seven candidates elected. The Public Surgeons' United also got 2 of the 8 candidates elected while the Hong Kong Public Doctors' Association failed to win a seat. The 5 members pro-democratic group won 2 seats including the former Legislative Councillor for the Medical functional constituency Kwok Ka-ki.

Religious sub-sector 
10 Election committee members are nominated by the Hong Kong Christian Council (HKCC), which was enlisted as the designated body for the Christian (Protestant) Sub-subsector. HKCC decided to adopt the "one Christian, one vote" method. The voting date was 30 October 2011. A total of 42 candidates were nominated. 17,380 of the 18,051 votes were counted as effective while there were 554 void votes and 117 blank votes. The result was considered as a landslide victory of the pro-Beijing faction.

Social Welfare sub-sector
The Social Welfare sub-sector was another stronghold of the pan-democracy camp. The Demo-Social 60 filled in 31 candidates in which many of them are the Democratic Party members such as Law Chi-kwong and Yeung Sum. 29 candidates were elected. The pro-democratic social workers' union Hong Kong Social Workers' General Union also had 29 candidates in which 28 of them were elected. A smaller pro-democratic group Progressive Social Work also had 2 of the 8 candidates elected.

The pro-Beijing Welfare Empower Hong Kong failed to win any seat.

District Councils sub-sectors
The pro-Beijing camp won a landslide victory in the Hong Kong and Kowloon District Councils sub-sector and the New Territories District Councils sub-sector following the major success in the District Council elections in November. The DAB became the largest winner with 55 seats, 26 in the Hong Kong and Kowloon District Councils sub-sector and 29 in the New Territories District Councils sub-sector. The pan-democracy candidates list failed to win any seat.

See also
 2012 Hong Kong Chief Executive election
 Politics of Hong Kong

References

E
E
E
2011 elections in China
E
December 2011 events in China